James Albert Gary (October 22, 1833 – October 31, 1920) was a U.S. political figure. Gary ran as the Republican candidate for Maryland Governor in 1879, losing to William Thomas Hamilton. He served as the Postmaster General between 1897 and 1898. He married Lavinia Washington in 1856. They had ten children with only eight surviving to adulthood. 
He spent much of his working life in textile manufacture in the Baltimore, Maryland, region, and was involved with cotton mills along the Patapsco and Patuxent Rivers, including Ely, Guilford, and Laurel, Maryland.

Gary was a prominent member of Baltimore's prestigious Brown Memorial Presbyterian Church and led the movement to establish Babcock Memorial Church there in memory of Brown Memorial's minister, Maltbie Babcock. He also contributed to the construction of a church in Daniels, MD, which was later named in his honor: Gary Memorial United Methodist Church.

Gary had a home in the Mount Vernon section of Baltimore and a summer place in Catonsville.

References

External links
 

|-

United States Postmasters General
People from Laurel, Maryland
1833 births
1920 deaths
McKinley administration cabinet members
19th-century American politicians
Maryland Republicans